Langao County is a county under the administration of Ankang, in the south of Shaanxi province, China. It borders Chongqing to the south.

Administrative divisions
As 2019, Langao County is divided to 12 towns.
Towns

Climate

References

 
County-level divisions of Shaanxi
Ankang